The 2014–15 St. John's Red Storm men's basketball team represented St. John's University during the 2014–15 NCAA Division I men's basketball season. The team was coached by Steve Lavin in his fifth year at the school. St. John's home games were played at Carnesecca Arena and Madison Square Garden and the team was members of the Big East Conference. They finished the season 21–12, 10–8 in Big East play to finish in fifth place. They lost in the quarterfinals of the Big East tournament to Providence. They received an at-large bid to the NCAA tournament where they lost in the first round to San Diego State. On March 27, 2015 St. John's and head coach Steve Lavin mutually agreed to part ways.

Previous season

The Red Storm finished the season 20–13, 10–8 in Big East play to finish in three-way tie for third place. They lost in the quarterfinals of the Big East tournament to Providence. They were invited to the National Invitation Tournament, where they lost to Robert Morris in the first round.

Departures

Class of 2014 signees

Transfer additions

Roster

Schedule

|-
!colspan=9 style="background:#CF102D; color:#FFFFFF;"| Exhibition

|-
!colspan=9 style="background:#CF102D; color:#FFFFFF;"| Non-conference regular season

|-
!colspan=9 style="background:#CF102D; color:#FFFFFF;"| Big East tournament

|-
!colspan=9 style="background:#CF102D; color:#FFFFFF;"| NCAA tournament

Rankings

Team players drafted into the NBA

References

St. John's
St. John's Red Storm men's basketball seasons
St. John's
St John
St John